BPM ("Beats Per Minute") is a current-based electronic dance music channel offered by Sirius XM Radio, operating on XM channel 51 (previously 81), Sirius channel 51 (previously 36, where it replaced The Beat on November 12, 2008) and Dish Network channel 6051.  DirecTV carried this channel on channel 859 until February 9, 2010. BPM can be heard on channel 51 for both services and Dish Network 6051 (99-51 on hopper) BPM features Geronimo, the Program Director, on weekdays 7-10am, Rida Naser on weekdays 10am-2pm, Ben Harvey on weekdays 2-6pm, Danny Valentino on Saturdays 10am-3pm and Sundays 12-5pm, Mallory Lynne on Saturdays 3-6pm and Sundays 5-9pm and Liquid Todd on weeknights 6-11pm.

BPM bills itself as the world's EDM leader.

Regular programming

Sirius XM currently describes the channel as follows:The world’s EDM leader! Spinning the EDM hits, remixes and club hits that bring the energy and passion of a weekend party into every day and night. #bpm @sxmelectro
BPM is presented in a Top 40 radio style. Its original program director was Blake Lawrence (known on-air as "Maxwell House"), who headed the channel until he left XM for New York's WQCD in 2004. BPM's original format, from 2001 through 2005, was current mainstream dance; in 2006 it made a slight shift toward the pop mainstream. However, in March 2009, its emphasis changed dramatically to focus primarily on remixed top-40 music, 90's dance cuts and selected songs that date to the early 1980s, a similar format to the former Sirius channel, "The Beat". With the launch of the new retro Dance channel Utopia in 2010, BPM has phased out the recurrents and gold product in order to focus on current product. BPM is commercial-free and has on-air DJs.

Despite being electronic music in general, the internet station can be adjusted to omit or strongly emphasize dubstep.

Former shows

33 & 1/3 This was the first dance music countdown show on BPM, which ran from 2001 to 2006. The program aired on Fridays, Saturdays and Sundays and counted down the top 33 & 1/3 songs (actually 34; 33 is the RPM on a dance 12" single, hence the show's name). In between the tracks, five new singles that were being tested as feedback for listeners called "Wannabes" was featured, along with a flashback of a number one song that reached the top spot on the show a year earlier. Originally hosted by Maxwell House (Blake Lawrence), then by Alan Freed.
The Spin Factor - A two-hour dance music countdown, hosted by former PD Alan Freed, showcasing the top songs on BPM based entirely on requests and user input. It consisted of approximately 28 songs and the #1 song from one year prior. This program replaced 33 & 1/3 in January 2006. In 2006, The Spin Factor aired every Sunday at 3pm ET, Monday at 6pm ET, and Monday nights at midnight ET. The Spin Factor was discontinued in January 2007; Its last weekly produced countdown program was December 24, 2006. No reason has yet been posted.
The BPM Project - An hour-long program that focused on new tracks and listeners were invited to respond with feedback on whether they want to hear them played regularly. Also hosted by Alan Freed, this program replaced the "Wannabes" segments that were part of 33 & 1/3.
Bullet Points - Daily short-form dance music news and event listings by Alan Freed. Each week's reports were published on the BPM web site attached to the weekly countdown chart.
Corsten's Countdown (which moved to sister dance station Electric Area) An interactive monthly countdown show hosted by Ferry Corsten. This series features new dance tracks, club mix sets and the top club songs voted on by listeners online.
D.U.I. (Dancing Under the Influence) (discontinued after the Sirius XM merger) Six hours of DJ sets from BPM Resident DJs
Melle Mel (Detroit)
DJ Armando (Hartford)
DJ Scotty Boy (Las Vegas)
Lil Cee (New York)

In addition, Matt Darey's Nocturnal (a popular worldwide dance music show) aired as part of the "D.U.I." block.

Melle Mel came aboard as a replacement for DJ Smooth.  Prior to the DUI show, DJ Smooth was one of the DJs who played the Rotation mix sets, from October 2002 to December 2005.

Global Domination (which moved to sister dance station Electric Area) features two-hour sets from five different DJs across the world (the name "Global Domination" comes from the far-flung nature of the DJs).
"Club Life" with DJ Tiësto of the Netherlands
"Nocturnal" with Matt Darey of London
"12 inches of Cox" with Chris Cox of Los Angeles
"Junior's World" with Junior Vasquez of New York
Jonathan Peters of New York
DJ Tiësto (replay)
Backspins With Boesche - An hour of classic dance music tracks from the 1990s and early 2000s mixed by BPM resident DJ Jon Boesche.
Air BPM (originally Air 81) - A three-hour block of DJ sets by BPM Resident DJs on Friday nights presented in the format of an imaginary flight across America from east to west. Each hour features a different DJ from a different city. Each hour the "flight" "touches down" in a new city and the next DJ plays. The block featured Johnny Budz (New York), Cato K (Miami), and DJ Leony (Orlando).
Air BPM in Reverse - Discontinued as of March 14, 2009. (Same as AIR BPM, but backwards with respect to programming schedule) An eight-hour block of DJ sets by BPM Resident DJs on Saturday nights presented in the format of an imaginary flight across America from east to west. Each hour features a different DJ from a different city. Each hour the "flight" "touches down" in a new city and the next DJ plays.
9pm ET - Mike Rizzo (New York)
10pm ET - DJ Theo (New York)
11pm ET - Joe Bermudez (Boston)
Midnight ET - DJ Leony (Orlando)
1am ET - Scotty Boy (Las Vegas)
2am ET - Cato K. (Miami)
3am ET - Nathan Scott (Chicago)
4am ET - Johnny Budz (New York)
Addiction w/ DJ Armando Used to air weeknights at 11pm ET/ 8pm PT, Sunday mornings at midnight ET/9pm PT. DJ Armando previously aired a live Addiction show at 5pm ET & 8pm ET. Many fans were disappointed by the move to 11pm.

The BEAT Morning Show was added on January 15, 2009, after the merger of BPM on November 12, 2008, with many subscribers upset about the new channel and music programming. The show was removed from the line-up just three months later, with no reason.

Criticism
As noted above, in March 2009, the emphasis changed dramatically to focus on remixed top-40 music, taking the playlist from the now-defunct Sirius 36 The Beat. Most of the older dance content is now on The Strobe. Immediately afterward, there was major public backlash, notably on the station's Facebook page and other fan pages on the web. Many hardcore dance/club fans were alienated by the music favored by the small minority to whom the channel was trying to appeal. After many months of BPM "crying wolf" about changes coming, on June 16, 2009, the channel's pure dance origins temporarily returned. The station announced that it had expanded the playlist to include the entire channel library from 2001 to the present. Shortly afterward on June 30, 2009, program director Skyy left the company. Management of the station shifted to Mike Abrams (who has been with XM since 2004) and Geronimo, former program director of the defunct pre-acquisition Sirius dance channel, "The Beat", known for its heavy focus on mainstream top-40 remixes and tracks from the 90s and 80s.

On January 15, 2009, "The Beat Morning Show with Geronimo" made its debut.  Geronimo was heard on The Beat during its run on Sirius, and the show feature music that was heard on The Beat previous to the combination of the two services.  As of June 13, 2009, "The Beat Morning Show" is no longer used on air or listed in the program guide.

Many subscribers had expressed their displeasure with the "Bagatelle Brunch" that aired on Saturday afternoons from 3 pm to 6 pm. An overwhelming number of comments on the station's Facebook fan page have complained that the allegedly live broadcast from a nightclub is poorly mixed, with excessive crowd noise and a heavy dose of non-electronic dance music (i.e. classic rock and R&B). As of October 12, 2009, BPM dropped the weekday 1pm "Best of Bagatelle Brunch" from the schedule.  As of February 5, 2011, due to subscriber backlash, the show has been canceled.

Awards
BPM was twice the recipient of the annual International Dance Music Awards' "Best Satellite Dance Channel" award (for calendar years 2004 and 2005). This is notable for the fact that the award was presented only twice and because the public votes on the awards. BPM was the favorite of the other XM dance cluster channels nominated - "The Move" and "The System" - as well as the dance channels on former competitor Sirius.

BPM has been nominated for a radio award in each of the subsequent IDMAs but has not won since 2005.

In 2015, program director, Geronimo, was named #21 on Billboard's list of top EDM Power Players

Other broadcast platforms
BPM was included in almost every XM cross-promotion previous to the 2008 acquisition and was heard by subscribers to DirecTV Satellite TV (ch. 859), and on two United States airlines: JetBlue and AirTran Airways, and on supported devices by users of AT&T Mobility, Sprint (for Sirius users) and Alltel wireless.

Core artists
The Chainsmokers
Calvin Harris
Tiësto
Armin Van Buuren
Kaskade
Marshmello
Eric Prydz
Martin Garrix
Morgan Page
ILLENIUM
Alison Wonderland
Joel Corry
Above & Beyond
David Guetta
Anabel Englund

References

External links
BPM website
Dance/Mix Show Airplay Chart - BPM is a reporter to the Billboard Dance Radio Airplay chart
BPM Spin Factor Chart Archive - An archive of "33 & 1/3" and "Spin Factor" charts including DJ set lists and music news
Alan Freed at Myspace including dance/club music news
ShoutDRIVE Radio Former XM BPM Program Director Alan Freed's dance site/station
International Dance Music Awards

Electronic dance music radio stations
Sirius XM Radio channels
Sirius Satellite Radio channels
XM Satellite Radio channels
Radio stations established in 2001